Daumas is a French surname. Notable people by that name include:

 Emma Daumas (born 1983), French singer-songwriter. 
 Eugène Daumas (1803–1871), French general and writer.
 Louis-Joseph Daumas (1801–1887), French sculptor and medallist. 
 François Daumas, French Egyptologist.

French culture